Flow management may refer to:
 Bandwidth management
 Network congestion
 Network traffic control
 People flow
 Traffic management